Rudolf Braun is a German politician of the Christian Democratic Union (CDU) and former member of the German Bundestag.

Life 
Braun was a member of the German Bundestag from 10 November 1994 to 26 October 1998 (one term). He was elected via a direct mandate from constituency 328 in Saxony. He was a full member of the Committee on the Interior and a deputy member of the Committee on Economic Cooperation and Development.  He is married and father of two children.

References 

1955 births
Living people
Members of the Bundestag for Saxony
Members of the Bundestag 1994–1998
Members of the Bundestag for the Christian Democratic Union of Germany